Kotliny may refer to the following places:
Kotliny, Łódź East County in Łódź Voivodeship (central Poland)
Kotliny, Zduńska Wola County in Łódź Voivodeship (central Poland)
Kotliny, Lublin Voivodeship (east Poland)